The Jaca Navarra, or Navarrese Horse, is a Spanish breed of small horse from the autonomous community of Navarre in the north-eastern part of the country. In 2013 it was listed in the Catálogo Oficial de Razas de Ganado de España in the group of autochthonous breeds in danger of extinction. The total population of the Jaca Navarra has been variously estimated at 350 (in 1999), 250 (in 2000), and 240 and decreasing (in 1997). In April 2011 the total population was reported to be 899, all of which were in Navarre. In 2000, and again in 2007, it was listed by the FAO as endangered.

A breeders' association, the Asociación de Criadores de Ganado Equino Jaca Navarra, was formed in 1999,  and a stud-book opened in 2001. The conservation and reference herd kept in semi-feral conditions at the Sabaiza estate contains all but a few examples of the breed.

Names 

In Spanish, this breed is also known as the Poney Navarro, Caballo Navarro, Caballo Vasco-navarro, Caballito de Andía, Caballito de las Améscoas or Caballito de la Barranca, and was in the past also known as Jaca de Montaña, Raza de Pamplona or Raza Pamplonica.

The word jaca has an unusual history, from Old Spanish haca, itself from Old French haque, which in turn is ultimately derived from the English place-name Hackney, a place famous for its horses.

Use 

The Jaca Navarra may be used as a light draught horse. It is reared for meat, and may be used in conservation grazing.

References

Further reading 

 Alberto Pérez de Muniáin Ortigosa, Martín Villanueva Vergara, Satur Napal Lecumberri (2007). Nuestros caballos: la Jaca Navarra y el Burguete (in Spanish). Pamplona: Editorial Evidencia Médica. .

Horse breeds
Horse breeds originating in Spain
Basque domestic animal breeds